Joe A. Griffiths (1910 – 9 March 1986) was a Maltese football player and coach who was the first manager of the Maltese national team, from 1957 to 1961.

References

1910 births
1986 deaths
Maltese footballers
Maltese football managers
Melita F.C. players
Rabat Ajax F.C. managers
Sliema Wanderers F.C. managers
Hibernians F.C. managers
Malta national football team managers

Association footballers not categorized by position